Ålefjær is a village and district in the municipality of Kristiansand in Agder county, Norway. The village and district lies in the far northern part of the municipality within the borough of Lund. The population of the district in 2014 was 410. Ålefjær borders the district of Tveit to the southeast, the district of Justvik to the southwest, the municipality of Vennesla to the northwest, and the municipality of Birkenes to the northeast. The village of Ålefjær is situated at the northern end of the Ålefjærfjorden, a branch off the Topdalsfjorden.

Transportation

References

Populated places in Agder
Geography of Kristiansand
Boroughs of Kristiansand